Barly is a commune in the Pas-de-Calais department in the Hauts-de-France region in northern France.

Geography
A farming village located 12 miles (19 km) southwest of Arras on the D8, D26 and D59 road junction.

Population

Sights
 The church of St. Leger, dating from the sixteenth century.
 The war cemetery.

 The eighteenth-century chateau was built between 1782 and 1784 by Vindicien-Antoine Blin, a former captain of the Rohan regiment. The work on the interior layout and the construction of outbuildings was continued until 1794 by his son, Jean-Vindicien Blin of Varlemont. He remained in Barly during the French Revolution and between 1812 and 1818 made the castle available to the bishop of Arras during the summer. After his death in 1832, his son sold the castle to the Countess of Tramecourt, who bequeathed it in 1879 to the Marquis du Luart. Owned by a Monsieur Duhem from 1914 to 1937, it was occupied by the Germans during the last war.

Left in a poor state when it was acquired in 1970 by Count Jacques d'Antin de Vaillac, the chateau has benefitted from considerable restoration with the help of the Historical Monuments of France.

See also
Communes of the Pas-de-Calais department

References

External links

 The CWGC cemetery
 Barly on the Quid website 

Communes of Pas-de-Calais